Haj Shahbazkhan Mosque (or Haj Shahbaz Khan Mosque) is a mosque located in the Ojagh Crossroads of Kermanshah, Iran.

The founder of Haj Shahbazkhan Mosque is one of great ones of the Kalhor tribe, who in the Fathalishah reign gained the tribe’s Ghale beigy rank. He was a famous and valuable person in his era, and is held in great respect by the people in Kermanshah city. The mosque was built in 1235 AH (1818 CE). In the book “Ancient Kermanshahan” it is stated: “Haj Shahbazkhan and his six brothers, who were the founders of a well known tribe that is called Hajizadegan, established a mosque in Kermanshah city in 1225 AH (1809 CE). This structure was a place for seminary students for some years but at present is famous as Haj Shahbazkhan Mosque”.

The mosque is located in a basement, with an elevation of 1781 m, that has a prayer hall and chambers around its courtyard. The courtyard is of diagonal fashion in an elevation of 437 m and lies in the middle of the mosque surrounded by chambers and the prayer hall. It seems that in the middle of the courtyard was an oval shaped pool but at present it has been destroyed. Access to the mosque is through the west and east sides, and it is a brick building. The west side of the mosque is opened in to back row, and the east side accesses to Modarress Avenue. Each chamber is adorned with a separate beautiful arch that accesses the courtyard. The cornice (Gharnize) of the wall of the courtyard is decorated with tile work and picturesque inscriptions from verses of the Holy Qur'an. At the entrance door of each chamber are inscriptions in separate beautiful tile work. The east side of the mosque is separated from the courtyard by a vestibule that has a domed ceiling. This domed ceiling is decorated with special decorative and constructing designs with plaster (Rasmibandi), and around this dome are beautiful decorations (Moaghali) that are a kind of Islamic decoration done by small tiles among bricks. From inside the vestibule we can access a small room that is used as a store room. In the south side of the courtyard lies a prayer hall whose roof comprises twenty domes with twelve columns, each made of a single piece of stone. These supporting columns are carved  in a spinning form (pichi). On the top of the columns there are capitals, each elaborately made of a single piece of stone and engraved in the form of steps. The domes which are present on the roof of the prayer hall are decorated with picturesque decorations (Rasmibandi), some of which are special decorations (Moaghali). The Rostrum (a high, staired seat from which a mullah gives his sermon) is located in the middle of the south side of the prayer hall that is decorated with colored tile work. The tiles which are used in the rostrum are colored light brown, azure tile and white, separated from each other with black lines. The chambers of the mosque were places for teaching seminary students.

Mosques in Iran
Buildings and structures in Kermanshah